Dangʻara District is a district of Fergana Region in Uzbekistan. The capital lies at the town Dangʻara. The district consists of 9 urban-type settlements (Dangʻara, Doimobod, Katta Ganjiravon, Katta Turk, Qum Qiyali, Toptiqsaroy, Tumor, Yuqori Urganji, Yangi zamon) and 8 rural communities.

References

Districts of Uzbekistan
Fergana Region